Manting Chan (born on December 7, 1987) is a Hong Kong-American singer and songwriter. Since her debut EP album Musical Journey was released in July 2011 by Sony Music Hong Kong, Manting has been called the "musical theater princess" by the Hong Kong media because of her sweet-heavenly voice and her love for musical theater.

Early life 
Manting was born in New York City, New York, and raised on Long Island. Her father is Chinese-Indonesian and her mother, from Fuzhou, Fujian, China. As a young child, Manting had her sights on what she wanted to become. It was either to be the first Asian-woman President of the United States or a singer. The event that changed her life was when Disney released Aladdin. It was the renowned song "A Whole New World" that made her choose the latter. She would sing the song and watch the movie every day for the entire school year. Manting entered the Metropolitan Opera Children's Choir at the age of 10 and was chosen by then music director, Elena Doria, to be one of the children singing in Puccini's La Boheme and later Khovanshchina, a Russian opera. It was then, Manting realized that she belonged to the stage.

Career Beginnings 
Manting released her maiden EP album in July 2011 where she wrote music and lyrics to her song "A Boy". She also wrote the lyrics to the song "Our Time is Now" and "Feelings on Fire", which was featured in Barbara Wong's movie the Break Up Club (Fiona Sit and Jaycee Chan). C Kwan from 農夫 aka FAMA wrote "One Way Ticket" for Manting, which depicts her own story - buying a one way ticket to Hong Kong and creating a life there. Hanjin Tan 陳奐仁 helped with the music for "Good to be a Girl".

Music Influences 
Manting's main influences are Celine Dion, Teresa Teng  鄧麗君, Han Hung 韓紅, and Luther Vandross. Musical Theater and Disney are her favorite genres, however, she is also very fond of Classical, AsianPop, Celtic, Enka, and Fado. She is able to sing in multiple languages including Cantonese, Mandarin, Japanese, Korean, Italian, Spanish, and English.

References 
 陳文婷晒唱功葉麗儀大讚 - 東方日報 http://orientaldaily.on.cc/cnt/entertainment/20120914/00282_038.html
 澳門印象……陳文婷！http://www.hokongsai.com/movie02/120127ManTing/manTing01.html
 陳文婷拍葉麗儀興奮 - 東方日報 http://orientaldaily.on.cc/cnt/entertainment/20120908/00282_043.html
 陳文婷蒙古遊飲羊奶護膚 - 東方日報 http://orientaldaily.on.cc/cnt/entertainment/20120803/00282_071.html?facebook=y
 陳文婷感激陳雋騫相助 http://the-sun.on.cc/cnt/entertainment/20110415/00470_040.html
 陳文婷挾儲蓄硬闖樂壇 http://hk.apple.nextmedia.com/enews/realtime/20110526/50016523
 陳文婷唱得打得好氣功 - 東方日報 http://orientaldaily.on.cc/cnt/entertainment/20120506/00282_029.html?
 美聲陳文婷承諾演繹更多廣東歌 http://stars-hk.com/wsp-topic.php?tid=12787
 陳文婷做歌手最緊要見得光 http://orientaldaily.on.cc/cnt/entertainment/20110429/00282_070.html
 陳文婷自爆高中無身材 http://hk.news.yahoo.com/video/陳文婷自爆高中無身材-045100029.html
 Jazz Harp Evening http://www.art-mate.net/?a=doc&id=9154&name=爵士豎琴之夜+Park+Stickney+Jazz+Evening
 Manting Chan 陳文婷 - 單程機票 MV http://www.tudou.com/programs/view/8KGS7aBJvrE/
 《分手說愛你》插曲女聲 - 陳文婷．首張EP．即將登場 http://mojim.net/tw_search_u2_KsGCnpbpwvY.html
 陳文婷轉攻廣東歌求突破 http://stars-hk.com/wsp-topic.php?tid=16586
 陳文婷 - Musical Journey https://web.archive.org/web/20140314103337/http://www.yvv.cn/ktv/mv/188920.html
 可能係今年最有實力既女新人 - 陳文婷 http://www.discuss.com.hk/viewthread.php?tid=14445266
 Habitat for Humanity China completed its Tai O Restoration Project https://web.archive.org/web/20150924024506/http://www.habitatchina.org/eng/mpress_detail?id=379
 Hazel love-in at Square One http://www.mississauga.com/news-story/3161753-hazel-love-in-at-square-one/
 Artists wow the crowd http://www.insidetoronto.com/whatson-story/3119227-artists-wow-the-crowd/
 美聲少女陳文婷再以歌宣揚環保 http://stars-hk.com/wsp-topic.php?tid=4977
 陳文婷瞓身答謝鋼琴猛男 http://orientaldaily.on.cc/cnt/entertainment/20110826/00282_120.html
 陳文婷封咪避好色男 http://orientaldaily.on.cc/cnt/entertainment/20111118/00282_095.html
 郭秀雲傳功陳文婷苦練下樁 http://orientaldaily.on.cc/cnt/entertainment/20120129/00282_017.html
 開騷前吃素保靚聲 陳文婷白健恩為保護海洋出力 - 香港文匯報 http://paper.wenweipo.com/2014/01/29/EN1401290015.htm
 陳文婷白健恩「情侶」共浴 https://web.archive.org/web/20140314103129/http://news.sina.com.hk/news/20120313/-15-2605155/1.html?rtext
 開騷前吃素保靚聲 白健恩 陳文婷為保護海洋出力 http://paper.wenweipo.com/2014/01/29/EN1401290016.htm
 陳文婷支持領養寵物不棄養 http://www.stars-hk.com/wsp-topic.php?tid=102163
 陳文婷讚白健恩似王子 https://web.archive.org/web/20140314102027/http://news.sina.com.hk/news/20111020/-15-2468068/1.html?rtext
 陳文婷情迷高跟鞋 http://orientaldaily.on.cc/cnt/entertainment/20120615/00282_049.html?
 小白陳文婷忙為音樂會綵排 http://www.qmodes.com/?p=6209
 陳文婷懷舊金曲氹長者 - 東方日報 http://orientaldaily.on.cc/cnt/entertainment/20120113/00282_092.html
 陳文婷白健恩唱盡單身之苦 http://the-sun.on.cc/cnt/entertainment/20120210/00470_076.html
 Nick Walton – Travel Chat / Phoebus Chan and Manting Chan – Colours of the Night http://programme.rthk.hk/channel/radio/programme.php?p=2505&e=150517&d=2011-08-24&m=episode
 陳文婷的藍眼線 http://www.ubeauty.com.hk/blog/rickykazaf/2012/07/10/陳文婷的藍眼線/
 陳文婷白健恩舉辦音樂會 http://hk.lifestyle.yahoo.com/video/白健恩-陳文婷舉辦音樂會-134000341.html
 2.5cm新蠔傑　加楓糖冧女生 http://hk.apple.nextmedia.com/supplement/food/art/20120622/16448519
 陳文婷幕後代唱 http://orientaldaily.on.cc/cnt/entertainment/20120525/00282_076.html
 白健恩與陳文婷籌備慈善音樂會希望有免費場地 http://www.stars-hk.com/wsp-topic.php?tid=90635

External links 
 Manting Chan 陳文婷 https://www.facebook.com/mantingmusic
 Manting Chan's channel on YouTube Chanmanting
 Break Up Club at the Hong Kong Movie DataBase
 Yesasia: Manting Chan's maiden EP album Musical Journey http://www.yesasia.com/global/1024660964-0-0-0-en/info.html

1987 births
American women singer-songwriters
Living people
American people of Hong Kong descent
American people of Chinese-Indonesian descent
21st-century American women singers
21st-century American singers